Pat Stakelum (6 May 1927 – 4 April 2008) was an Irish sportsperson.  He played hurling with his local club Holycross–Ballycahill and was a member of the Tipperary senior inter-county team from 1947 until 1957.  Stakelum captained Tipperary to the All-Ireland title in 1949.

Playing career

Club

Pat Stakelum played his club hurling with his local Holycross–Ballycahill club and enjoyed much success.   Although not regarded as one of the most successful clubs in the county he won three senior county titles in 1948 (the club's first county championship title), 1951 and 1954.

Inter-county

Pat Stakelum first came to prominence on the inter-county scene in the early 1940s as a member of the Tipperary minor hurling team.  He won a Munster medal in this grade in 1945 before later lining out in the All-Ireland final.  A high-scoring game followed, however, Dublin were the winners by 3-14 to 4-6.

Pat Stakelum's skills were quickly noted and he soon joined the Tipperary senior hurling team. He made his debut in 1947, however, Tipp were going through a barren spell. All this changed during the 1948-49 National Hurling League. It was that year that Stakelum, captain of the team, enjoyed his first major success as Tipp defeated arch-rivals Cork to take the National League title. Both sides met again in the Munster Championship with Tipp recording another victory. The men from the 'premier county' later defeated Limerick by 1-16 to 2-10, giving Stakelum a Munster medal. He subsequently lined out in his first All-Ireland final at senior level. Surprisingly, Laois were the opponents on that occasion, however, the result was expected. Tipp opened the floodgates with a Paddy Kenny goal before Jimmy Kennedy added two more goals in the second-half.  At the full-time whistle Tipp were the victors by 3-11 to 0-3 and Stakelum had captured an All-Ireland while also having the honour of lifting the Liam MacCarthy Cup.

In 1950 Pat Stakelum added a second consecutive National League medal to his collection before further provincial glory followed.  A 2-17 to 3-11 defeat of Cork gave him a second consecutive Munster medal and an easy passage into another All-Ireland final.  Kilkenny provided the opposition on that occasion in a close but uninteresting game.  At the final whistle Tipp emerged the victors by 1-9 to 1-8 giving Stakelum a second All-Ireland medal.

In 1951 Stakelum captured a third Munster title following a 2-11 to 2-9 defeat of arch-rivals Cork.  This victory resulted in Tipp being installed as the favourites for a third consecutive All-Ireland title.  Wexford, however, stood in Tipp's way after making a long-awaited breakthrough in Leinster.  Nicky Rackard had been Wexford's star goal-poacher throughout the year, however, his artistry was beaten by Tony Reddin in the Tipperary goal-mouth.  Séamus Bannon, Tim Ryan and Paddy Kenny got the goals in the second quarter that did the damage, however, Tipp forged ahead to win by 7-7 to 3-9.  It was Stakelum's third consecutive All-Ireland medal.

For the next three years Stakelum's Tipperary side were defeated by Cork in the Munster championship.  It wasn't the end of his playing days, however, as he captured further National League honours in 1952, 1954, 1955 and 1957.

Provincial

Pat Stakelum also lined out with Munster in the inter-provincial hurling championship where he played alongside his championship rivals Christy Ring, Tom Cheasty and Jimmy Smyth.  He first tasted success with his province in 1950 as Munster defeated Leinster to take the Railway Cup title.  Both Munster and Leinster qualified for the Railway Cup final again in 1951.  With Pat playing a key role Munster claimed a second consecutive victory over their great rivals.  1952 saw the Munster men capture a third successive title, this time following a victory over Connacht.  In 1953 it was four in-a-row for Pat and for Munster as Leinster were accounted for once again.  After a defeat by Leinster in the Railway Cup final of 1954 Pat won a fifth title in 1955 after Connacht were beaten once again.  In 1957 Pat Stakelum captured a final Railway Cup medal as MUnster accounted for Leinster once again.

Post-playing career

Following Stakelum's retirement from club and inter-county hurling he moved into the administrative side of the GAA. He served as secretary of the Tipperary County Board in 1961 and 1962, a period which saw Tipp capture back-to-back All-Ireland titles. In the 1970s Stakelum helped set up the Dúrlas Óg Club in Thurles.  It was a move which kick-started the rejuvenation of Gaelic games in the town where the association was founded.  Stakelum served as a selector on a number of Tipperary senior hurling teams and saw his nephews, Richard and Conor Stakelum and Bobby and Aidan Ryan achieve success with Tipperary.

Pat Stakelum died on 4 April 2008.

References

Teams

1927 births
2008 deaths
Holycross-Ballycahill hurlers
Tipperary inter-county hurlers
Munster inter-provincial hurlers
All-Ireland Senior Hurling Championship winners